Pepper Research Station (PRS) is one of the oldest institutions in India under Kerala Agricultural University situated at Panniyoor, Kannur.

PRS started in 1952, and came under KAU in 1972. The institution is known for developing the world's first artificially pollinated variety of Pepper, commonly known as Panniyoor One.

References

External links
 Official website

Agricultural research stations in Kerala
1952 establishments in India
Education in Kannur district
Research institutes established in 1952